Skorokoro is a 2016 South African TV Film directed by Darrell Roodt.  It was nominated for a Golden Horn award in 2017. The film was produced by Phoenix films in South Africa.

The movie was originally planned as a big screen production but failed to make the grade and was reduced to airing only as a local TV production.

Plot
Happiness and Rose fall in love in a small village in South Africa. They would like to get married, but their families keep that from happening. Happiness decides to enter a race with his old taxi in order to win prize money to pay for his lobola. Happiness will be allowed to marry Rose if and only if he can pay the required lobola.

References

External links

2016 television films
South African romantic comedy films
2016 romantic comedy films